Gazeta may refer to:

in Albania-language newspapers,
Gazeta 55, daily newspaper
Gazeta Rilindja Demokratike, daily newspaper
Gazeta Shqip, daily newspaper
in Polish-language newspapers,
 Gazetagazeta.com, a Polish-language daily newspaper, published in Toronto 
 Gazeta Olsztyńska, a Polish-language newspaper, published 1886–1939 in Prussia
 Gazeta Polska, a Polish weekly
 Gazeta Polska (1929–1939), a newspaper of interwar Poland, published from 1929 to 1939 in Warsaw
 Gazeta Warszawska, the first newspaper published regularly in Warsaw 
 Gazeta Wyborcza, a Polish newspaper

in Russian-language newspapers,
 Gazeta.ru, a Russian newspaper
 Literaturnaya Gazeta, a weekly cultural and political newspaper published in Russia 
 Nezavisimaya Gazeta, a Russian-language daily newspaper
 Novaya Gazeta, a Russian newspaper 
 Roman-Gazeta, a literary monthly in the Soviet Union
 Rossiyskaya Gazeta, a Russian government daily newspaper 

in other newspapers,
 A Gazeta (Espírito Santo), a Brazilian newspaper published in Vitória
 Gazeta (newspaper), a Serbian newspaper
 Gazeta de Caracas, the first newspaper printed in Venezuela
 Gaceta de Puerto Rico, the first newspaper published on the island of Puerto Rico
 Gazeta de Transilvania, the first Romanian-language newspaper to be published in Transylvania 
 Gazeta Express, a Kosovo newspaper published in Pristina 
 Gazeta Sot, a daily newspaper published in Albania 
 Gazeta Sporturilor, a daily newspaper in Romania 
 Gazeta.ua, a Ukrainian newspaper

in other uses,
 Ionian gazeta, a currency formerly used in the Ionian Islands
 Rede Gazeta, (also known as TV Gazeta), a Brazilian television network

See also
 Gazette